Akbarpur-Raniya Assembly constituency is one of 403 legislative assembly seats of the Uttar Pradesh. It is part of the Akbarpur Lok Sabha constituency. It is part of Kanpur Dehat district.

Overview
Akbarpur-Raniya comprises KCs 1-Akbarpur, 3-Raniya, 4-Rura, 5-Shiwali, Shiwali TA, Akbarpur TA & Rura TA of 3-Akbarpur Tehsil.

Members of Legislative Assembly

Election results

2022

2017

 
|-
! style="background-color:#E9E9E9" align=left width=225|Party
! style="background-color:#E9E9E9" align=right|Seats won
! style="background-color:#E9E9E9" align=right|Seat change
|-
|align=left|Bharatiya Janata Party
| align="center" | 5
| align="center" | 4
|-
|align=left|Samajwadi Party
| align="center" | 0
| align="center" | 4
|-
|align=left|Bahujan Samaj Party
| align="center" | 0
| align="center" | 0
|-
|align=left|Indian National Congress
| align="center" | 0
| align="center" | 0
|-
|}

See also
 List of Vidhan Sabha constituencies of Uttar Pradesh

References

External links
 

Assembly constituencies of Uttar Pradesh
Kanpur Dehat district